The Economic Information Daily , also translated into English as Economic Reference Paper or Economic Reference Daily,  is a Chinese state-run newspaper specializing in economics, based in Beijing.

Economic Information Daily is sponsored and supervised by Xinhua News Agency,  and is directly contacted and directed by the Central Policy Research Office of China.

Inaugurated in Beijing on 1 July 1981,   Economic Information Daily is the first national economic professional newspaper born during China's Reform and opening up. On 7 December 1990, Deng Xiaoping wrote the name of the Economic Information Daily in his own handwriting. 

On July 17, 2013, Wang Wenzhi (王文志), the principal reporter of the Economic Information Daily, reported in his Sina Weibo that the chairman of China Resources Group, Song Lin, was suspected of huge corruption.  Wang accused Song Lin of intentionally overpaying for a coal-industry acquisition, resulting in the loss of billions of state property.

References

Xinhua News Agency
Publications established in 1981
Daily newspapers published in China
Chinese-language newspapers (Simplified Chinese)